Nicrophorus germanicus is a burying beetle described by Carl Linnaeus in his landmark 1758 10th edition of Systema Naturae. Males are larger than females and can reach a body length of 27 mm.

References

Silphidae
Beetles of North America
Taxa named by Carl Linnaeus
Beetles described in 1758